Mabula Game Reserve is a private game reserve situated in the Limpopo province of South Africa.

Wildlife 
The list of species found in the reserve includes sixty mammals, three hundred birds, one hundred plants and numerous reptiles and insects.

Wildlife includes the big five: lion, leopard, buffalo, African elephant and rhinoceros, as well as the little five: ant lion, leopard tortoise, buffalo weaver, elephant shrew and rhino beetle.

Apart from these, the following mammals can be seen here:

Hedgehog, lesser bushbaby, vervet monkey, chacma baboon, pangolin, scrub hare, tree squirrel, spring hare, greater cane rat, porcupine, bat-eared fox, black-backed jackal, striped polecat, honey badger, Cape clawless otter, African civet, large spotted genet, small spotted genet, yellow mongoose, marsh mongoose, slender mongoose, white-tailed mongoose, banded mongoose, aardwolf, spotted hyena, brown hyena, cheetah, caracal, serval, Southern African wildcat, black-footed cat, aardvark, rock hyrax, Burchell's zebra, bushpig, common warthog, hippo, giraffe, klipspringer, common duiker, steenbok, blesbok, reedbuck, mountain reedbuck, impala, springbok, blue wildebeest, black wildebeest, tsessebe, red hartebeest, gemsbok, waterbuck, bushbuck, nyala, kudu and eland.

Accommodation 
 The main lodge is called Mabula Game Lodge. It has 53 thatched chalets each with its own bathroom. There are also some conference facilities, restaurant, bar, playrooms, etc.
 Modjadji Camp, deeper into the bush, with its own swimming pool and tennis courts.
 Kwafubesi Tented Safari Camp.

See also 
 Protected areas of South Africa

References

External links

 http://www.mabula.com/

Nature reserves in South Africa